Nikos Bourganis (born 21 April 1997) is a Greek professional footballer who plays as a goalkeeper for Super League 2 club Niki Volos.

Career

Early career
Nikolaos Bourganis has been at PAOK since 2019. He is a strong, tall and ever-evolving goalkeeper, comfortable with the ball at his feet and possesses great reactions in one-on-one situations. He first became acquainted with the position of goalkeeper at the age of seven at Theseas Agrias, although he started out as a striker. At the age of 18 he went to Niki Volou, followed by Olympiakos Volou (making two appearances in the third tier), then Volos (26 appearances), where he remained after the team was promoted to the second tier. In 2019, PAOK entered his life and at the same time AE Karaiskakis – along with Chatzistravos and Meletidis – where in two seasons he played in 16 games. It’s now time for him to wear the Double-headed Eagle on his chest for PAOK B.

Honours
Volos
Gamma Ethniki: 2017–18
Football League: 2018–19

References

1997 births
Living people
Greek footballers
Gamma Ethniki players
Football League (Greece) players
Super League Greece players
Super League Greece 2 players
Olympiacos Volos F.C. players
Volos N.F.C. players
PAOK FC players
A.E. Karaiskakis F.C. players
PAOK FC B players
Niki Volos F.C. players
Association football goalkeepers
People from Agria
Footballers from Thessaly